Paul McLaughlin is a New Zealand actor who won the Cloud 9 award for Actor of the Year in 2004. He works out of Wellington, New Zealand, where he lives with his wife—singer, foley-artist and actress, Carrie McLaughlin.

Career
McLaughlin graduated from Toi Whakaari: New Zealand Drama School in 1996 with a Diploma in Acting. McLaughlin has had roles in the TV series Jackson's Wharf, as Brian Peek, and Seven Periods with Mr Gormsby, as Principal Roger Dasent. He has also had guest roles in numerous other television series and in film - including The Lord of the Rings.

In 2006 he founded site-specific.co.nz, a devising theatre company. The first play was Hotel, a show for 12 audience members at a time set in a real, luxury hotel suite.

His stage credits include The Love of Humankind, The Bach, Drawer of Knoves, Peninsula and Te Karakia.

In 2004 he won the Chapman Tripp Theatre Award for Actor of the Year for the title role in Albert Speer.

Filmography

Film

Television

Theatre
Co-starred in the show "Me and Robert McKee". The show debuted November 2010 at Wellington theater Circa.

Paul plays Mac a disgruntled banker who, after running up millions of dollars of debt, devises a plan to get out. Paul uses his writer friend Billy to raise $250,000 in funding for a film. He then leaves his wife and runs away with the money.

External links

References

Year of birth missing (living people)
Living people
New Zealand male television actors
New Zealand male film actors
New Zealand male stage actors

Toi Whakaari alumni